"Always Love" is a song by Japanese pop group, MAX. It was released as their 19th single and was used as the ending theme to the NTV program, Sports Max. It is the last of five singles leading up to their fourth original studio album, Emotional History (2001). The song was written by Hiromi Mori who has worked with MAX on their singles, "Shinin'on-Shinin'love and "Love Impact." It was composed by T2ya and is his first production with the group.

Music video
The music video was filmed on January 23, 2001 at Aoyama no Bou Studio. It focused almost entirely on the group's dance choreography with solo scenes of each member in various costumes.

Track list

Chart performance

Personnel
 Executive producer: Johnny Taira
 Produced by Max Matsuura
 Co-produced by Junichi "Randy" Tsuchiya
 Director: Yukihito Sakakibara
 A&R chief: Vanity Maekawa
 A&R: Toshikazu Sakawa
 Mixed by Naoki Yamada
 Mixed at Planet Kingdom Studio
 Recording engineers: Hiroto Kobayashi
 Computer programmer: T2ya
 Mastered by Toshiya Horiuchi
 Promotion: Takashi Kasuga, Yukio Takemura, Akira Kobayashi, Seij Fukagawa

Art direction and design
 Art direction and design: Katsuhito Tadokoro
 Photography: Sunao Ohmori
 Stylist: Akarumi Someya
 Hair & make-up: Maki Tawa
 Creative coordinator: Naoki Ueda

References

2001 singles
MAX (band) songs
Song recordings produced by Max Matsuura
Songs written by T2ya
2001 songs
Avex Trax singles